These are the rosters of all participating teams at the men's water polo tournament at the 2004 Summer Olympics in Athens.

Pool A

The following is the Croatian roster in the men's water polo tournament of the 2004 Summer Olympics.

Head coach: Zoran Roje

The following is the Hungarian roster in the men's water polo tournament of the 2004 Summer Olympics.

Head coach: Dénes Kemény

The following is the Kazakh roster in the men's water polo tournament of the 2004 Summer Olympics.

Head coach: Askar Orazalinov

The following is the Russian roster in the men's water polo tournament of the 2004 Summer Olympics.

Head coach: Aleksandr Kabanov

The following is the Serbia and Montenegrin roster in the men's water polo tournament of the 2004 Summer Olympics.

Head coach: Nenad Manojlović

The following is the American roster in the men's water polo tournament of the 2004 Summer Olympics.

Head coach:  Ratko Rudić

Pool B

The following is the Australian roster in the men's water polo tournament of the 2004 Summer Olympics.

Head coach: Erkin Shagaev

The following is the Egyptian roster in the men's water polo tournament of the 2004 Summer Olympics.

Head coach: Adel Shamala

The following is the German roster in the men's water polo tournament of the 2004 Summer Olympics.

Head coach: Hagen Stamm

The following is the Greek roster in the men's water polo tournament of the 2004 Summer Olympics.

Head coach:  Alessandro Campagna

The following is the Italian roster in the men's water polo tournament of the 2004 Summer Olympics.

Head coach: Paolo de Crescenzo

The following is the Spanish roster in the men's water polo tournament of the 2004 Summer Olympics.

Head coach: Joan Jane

References

External links
Official Olympic Coverage

Men's team rosters
 
2004